Donald C. Popplewell (born January 24, 1949) is a former American football player.  He played college football for the Colorado
Buffaloes and was a consensus All-American center in 1970.

Popplewell was raised in Raytown, Missouri. He attended the University of Colorado Boulder where he played college football at the center position for the Colorado Buffaloes.  He was six feet, two inches tall and weighed 240 pounds as a football player at Colorado.  He was a member of the 1969 Colorado Buffaloes football team that defeated Alabama in the 1969 Liberty Bowl, and, as a senior, he played for the west team in the East–West Shrine Game.  He was also a consensus selection to the 1970 College Football All-America Team, receiving first-team honors from the United Press International, Associated Press, Newspaper Enterprise Association, and Football Writers Association of America.

Popplewell was selected by the Los Angeles Rams in the 10th round (254th overall pick) of the 1971 NFL Draft, but he did not play in the National Football League.

References

Living people
All-American college football players
American football centers
Colorado Buffaloes football players
Players of American football from Missouri
People from Raytown, Missouri
1949 births